Batesanthus is a genus of flowering plants belonging to the family Apocynaceae.

Its native range is Western Tropical Africa to Angola.

Species:

Batesanthus parviflorus 
Batesanthus pseudopalpus 
Batesanthus purpureus

References

Apocynaceae
Apocynaceae genera
Taxa named by N. E. Brown